Belgian heraldry is the form of coats of arms and other heraldic bearings and insignia used in the Kingdom of Belgium and the Belgian colonial empire but also in the historical territories that make up modern-day Belgium. Today, coats of arms in Belgium are regulated and granted by different bodies depending on the nature, status, and location of the armiger.

Characteristics 
The characteristic of Belgian heraldry are similar to varying degrees to those of its neighbouring countries' (France, Netherlands, Germany).

Helms 

In Belgium, barred helms are most commonly used, and are not reserved for the nobility like in some jurisdictions. They most often have gold bars, as well as a gold collar and trim. They are often lined and attached to the escutcheon with a shield strap.

Mottos 
A distinct characteristic that isn't found in anglo-saxon heraldry is that the motto, motto scroll and letters thereon are blazoned.

History

Terminology 
Like English and some other countries' heraldry, achievements of arms are usually blazoned in a specialized jargon.

Civic heraldry

National arms

Other versions

Communities, regions, and language areas

Provinces

Municipal heraldry 
Municipal heraldry is regulated through the competent council of the community in question, which are the Council of Heraldry and Vexillology for the French Community and the Flemish Heraldic Council for the Flemish Community.

Colonial heraldry

Royal heraldry 
The coats of arms of the Belgian royal family is currently regulated by a Royal Decree published on 19 July 2019 and signed on the same day, by King Philippe. This decree also reinstated the Saxonian escutcheon in all the royal versions of the family's coat of arms. The reinstatement of the shield of Saxe-Coburg-Gotha into the royal arms occurred shortly after the visit of King Philippe and Queen Mathilde to the ancestral Friedenstein Castle. The king also added translations of the motto into the three official languages of Belgium, to reflect his wish "to be the King of the whole Kingdom and of all Belgians". The latest royal decree therefore reverses previous changes made to the Royal versions of the coat arms which removed the armorial bearings of Saxony during the First World War.

 Coats of arms of the King

 Coats of arms of the Royal family

Individuals and families 
Like civic arms, arms of non-noble individuals and families (in the form of family associations) are regulated by the competent council of the community in question. These are the Council of Heraldry and Vexillology for the French Community and the Flemish Heraldic Council for the Flemish Community. Today, both councils grant a helm with torse and mantling as well as a motto as additaments of the shield. The additaments reserved for the nobility, such as crowned helmets (i.e. crest coronets) and rank crowns (coronets), supporters, banners and battle cries, mantles and pavilions, are prohibited.

Before that, the Genealogical and Heraldic Office of Belgium recorded the arms of persons and families.

Nobility 
Arms of the Belgian nobility are regulated by the Council of Nobility.

Coronets rankings

Ecclesiastical heraldry

See also 
 National symbols of Belgium
 Leo Belgicus
 Burgher arms

Notes and references

Bibliography

Heraldic laws and customs in Belgium 
 
 chevalier Braas, La législation nobiliaire en Belgique, Brussels, 1960.
 Claude Chaussier, Le droit ancien et actuel des armoiries non nobles en Belgique, Brussels: Éditions du S.C.G.D., 1980.
 Jean-Baptiste Christyn, Jurisprudentia Heroica, Brussels, 1668 and 1689.
 Georges Dansaert, ″L'Art Héraldique et ses diverses applications″, in: Nouvel armorial belge, Brussels, 1949, pp. 113–119.
 Georges Dansaert, ″Du droit de propriété des armoiries et de ses conséquences″, in: Nouvel armorial belge, Brussels, 1949, pp. 7–110.
 Lucien Fourez, Le droit héraldique dans les Pays-Bas catholiques, Brussels, 1932.
 Octave le Maire, "Diplômes d'armoiries bourgeoises conférées par le roi Guillaume", in: L'Intermédiaire des généalogistes, Brussels, n° 91, 1961, pp. 34–36.
 Pierre Nisot, Le droit des armoiries. Essai de systématisation et de construction théorique, préface de M. C. Terlinden, professeur à l'Université de Louvain, membre du Conseil héraldique de Belgique, membre de la Commission royale d'histoire, Brussels : P. Dyckmans, 1924.
 Jean Scohier, L'Estat et comportement des armes, Brussels, 1597.
 PANTENS, Chr., Le cri en héraldique, in: Le Parchemin, 58, 1993, n° 285, p. 171-184.
 VAN ORMELINGEN, J.-J., De toekenning van het adellijk wapen, in: Le Droit nobiliaire et le Conseil héraldique (1844–1994), Brussels, 1994, p. 139-169.
 DE MOFFARTS D'HOUCHENÉE, baron St., L'écartelé, mode de rappel, dans les armoiries concédées, d'armoiries d'une autre famille, in: Le Droit nobiliaire et le Conseil héraldique (1844–1994), Brussels, 1994, p. 221-234.
 HOUTART, J.-F. (ed.), Florilegium Heraldicae Belgicae (Fédération généalogique et héraldique de Belgique, Cahier  4), Brussels, 2004.
 VAN ORMELINGEN, J.-J., Enregistrement officiel d'armoiries en Belgique, in: A. VANDEWALLE, L. VIAENE-AWOUTERS & L. DUERLOO (eds.), Genealogica & Heraldica. Handelingen van het XXVI Internationaal Congres voor Genealogische en Heraldische Wetenschappen, Brussel/Bruxelles, 2006, p. 427-436 (cf. VAN ORMELINGEN, J.-J., L'enregistrement officiel des armoiries en Belgique, in: Bulletin de l'Association de la noblesse du Royaume de Belgique, n° 246, avril 2006, p. 3-14). 
 Jules Bosmans, Traité d'héraldique belge, 1890.

Armorials

Individuals and families 
 P. Bohet et H. Willems, Armorial belge, Brussels, 1965.
 Damien Breuls de Tiecken, Armorial bruxellois, Brussels, 2009.
 Georges Dansaert, Armorial belge du bibliophile (same with viscount de Jonghe d'Ardoye and J. Havenith), Brussels, 1930.
 Georges Dansaert, Nouvel armorial belge, ancien et moderne, précédé de l'art héraldique et ses diverses applications, Brussels : Éditions J. Moorthamers, 1949.
 Georges de Crayencour, Dictionnaire Héraldique, tous les termes et figures du blason, Brussels : G. de Crayencour, 1974 (first edition).
 Armorial héraldique vivante, in: Le Parchemin, Genealogical and Heraldic Office of Belgium, 2003.
 Jan van Helmont, Dictionnaire de Renesse. Lexique héraldique illustré, Louvain, 1994.
 Jean-Paul Springael, Armoiries de personnes physiques et d'association familiale en communauté française, edited by the direction of the Patrimoine culturel
 Carnet Mondain
 État présent de la noblesse belge [fr; nl]

Municipalities 
 Lieve Viaene-Awouters and Ernest Warlop, Armoiries communales en Belgique, Communes wallonnes, bruxelloises et germanophones, 2002, 2 volumes.

External links 
 Heraldry in Belgium on the website of the Genealogical and Heraldic Office of Belgium (in French)
 The Council of Nobility 
 The Council of Heraldry and Vexillology
 The Flemish Heraldic Council

 
Belgian coats of arms